Luni or Lo(o)ni may refer to :

Places and jurisdictions 
in Europe - Italy
 Luni, Italy, a town in Liguria
 the former Latin Catholic Diocese of Luni, with see in the above town

in India
 Luni, Rajasthan , a town in Rajasthan, India
 Luni River, in Rajasthan, India
in Pakistan
 Luni (Balochistan), a village in Pakistani Baluchistan
 Looni (also spelled Luni), a town and union council in Khyber-Pakhtunkhwa
 Luni (Punjab), a village in Pakistani province Punjab

People 
 Loni (Pashtun tribe), also spelled Luni
 Arman Loni (1983-2019), Pashtun human rights activist
 Wranga Loni, Pashtun human rights activist (sister of Arman Loni)

Other uses 
 Luni Coleone (born 1978), California rapper

See also 
 Looney (disambiguation)